SCAN domain-containing protein 1 is a protein that in humans is encoded by the SCAND1 gene.

Function 

The SCAN domain is a highly conserved, leucine-rich motif of approximately 60 amino acids originally found within a subfamily of zinc finger proteins. This gene belongs to a family of genes that encode an isolated SCAN domain, but no zinc finger motif. Functional studies have established that the SCAN box is a protein interaction domain that mediates both hetero- and homoprotein associations, and maybe involved in regulation of transcriptional activity. Two transcript variants with different 5' UTRs, but encoding the same protein, have been described for this gene.

Interactions 

SCAND1 has been shown to interact with MZF1.

References

Further reading